Gyula Zombori (1903 – 8 May 1946) was a Hungarian wrestler. He competed in two events at the 1932 Summer Olympics.

References

External links
 

1903 births
1946 deaths
Hungarian male sport wrestlers
Olympic wrestlers of Hungary
Wrestlers at the 1932 Summer Olympics
Sportspeople from Somogy County